Nashville (formerly, Nashville Bar, Quartzville, and Quartzburg) is an unincorporated community in El Dorado County, California.

The place was first called Nashville Bar, then Quartzville and Quartzburg, before being named for Nashville, Tennessee.

A post office operated in Nashville from 1852 to 1854 and from 1870 to 1907.

References

Unincorporated communities in El Dorado County, California
Cosumnes River
Mining communities of the California Gold Rush
Unincorporated communities in California